The World Figure Skating Championships is an annual figure skating competition sanctioned by the International Skating Union in which figure skaters compete for the title of World Champion.

Men's competition took place on February 4 in Munich, German Empire. Ulrich Salchow did not participate because he feared that the judgement would not be fair in Gilber Fuchs' hometown Munich. Ladies' competition took place from January 28th to 29th in Davos, Switzerland. It was the first World Championships in figure skating for ladies.

Results

Men

Judges:
 C. Gützlaff 
 Ludwig Fänner 
 O. Henning 
 Robert Holletschek 
 Otto Schöning

Ladies

Judges:
 E. Collingwood 
 M. Holtz 
 Tibor von Földváry 
 Dr. H. Winzer 
 P. Birum

Sources
 Result List provided by the ISU

World Figure Skating Championships
World Figure Skating Championships, 1906
World 1906
World 1906
World Figure Skating Championships, 1906
World Figure Skating Championships, 1906
1900s in Munich
1906 in Swiss sport
1906 in German sport
January 1906 sports events
February 1906 sports events